Anne Genetet (born 20 April 1963) is a French medical doctor and politician who has been serving as a member of the French National Assembly since the 2017 elections, representing the Eleventh constituency for French residents overseas. under the label of La République en Marche (LREM).

Early career
In 2005, Genetet moved to Singapore with her husband and four sons. She subsequently founded the Help Agency, a consultancy to advise maids and their employers on health and legal matters. She also worked with non-governmental organizations on maid issues.

Political career
In parliament, Genetet serves on the Committee on Foreign Affairs and the Parliamentary Office for the Evaluation of Scientific and Technological Choices (OPECST). In addition to her committee assignments, she chairs the French-Iranian Parliamentary Friendship Group.

Political positions
In May 2018, Genetet co-sponsored an initiative in favour of legalizing assisted reproductive technology (ART) for all women (singles, heterosexual couples or lesbian couples).

In July 2019, Genetet voted in favor of the French ratification of the European Union’s Comprehensive Economic and Trade Agreement (CETA) with Canada.

References

1963 births
Living people
La République En Marche! politicians
Deputies of the 15th National Assembly of the French Fifth Republic
Women members of the National Assembly (France)
21st-century French women politicians
People from Neuilly-sur-Seine
Politicians from Île-de-France
Paris Descartes University alumni
20th-century French physicians
21st-century French physicians
21st-century Singaporean physicians
20th-century French women
Members of Parliament for French people living outside France
Deputies of the 16th National Assembly of the French Fifth Republic